The Kinsley Civil War Monument, in Hillside Cemetery in Kinsley, Kansas, was built in 1917.  It was listed on the National Register of Historic Places in 2008.

It was designed by David A. Lester in Classical Revival style.

References

Monuments and memorials on the National Register of Historic Places in Kansas
Neoclassical architecture in Kansas
Buildings and structures completed in 1917
Edwards County, Kansas